Aleksandr Vladimirovich Osipov (born 21 October 1998) is a Russian football player. He plays for FC Baltika Kaliningrad.

Club career
He made his debut in the Russian Football National League for FC Veles Moscow on 1 August 2020 in a game against FC Tekstilshchik Ivanovo, as a starter.

References

External links
 
 Profile by Russian Football National League
 

1998 births
People from Kolomna
Sportspeople from Moscow Oblast
Living people
Russian footballers
Association football midfielders
FC Arsenal Tula players
FC Veles Moscow players
FC Baltika Kaliningrad players
Russian First League players
Russian Second League players